is a passenger railway station in the city of Minamibōsō, Chiba Prefecture, Japan, operated by the East Japan Railway Company (JR East).

Lines
Iwai Station is served by the Uchibō Line, and is located 73.7 km from the western terminus of the line at Soga Station.

Station layout
The station is an at-grade station with a single island platform connected to the station building by a footbridge. The station is staffed.

Platforms

History
Iwai Station was opened on August 10, 1918. The station was absorbed into the JR East network upon the privatization of the Japan National Railways (JNR) on April 1, 1987.

Passenger statistics
In fiscal 2019, the station was used by an average of 244 passengers daily (boarding passengers only).

Surrounding area
 
 Former Tomiyama Town Hall

See also
 List of railway stations in Japan

References

External links

 JR East Station information  

Railway stations in Chiba Prefecture
Railway stations in Japan opened in 1918
Uchibō Line
Minamibōsō